Chen Xusheng may refer to:

Chen Hsueh-sheng (born 1952), Taiwanese politician
Chen Shei-saint (born 1957), or Apollo Chen, Taiwanese politician